Ceiba insignis (syn. Chorisia insignis), the white floss-silk tree, is a species of flowering plant in the family Malvaceae, native to dry tropical forests of southern Ecuador and northern Peru. It has found use as a street tree in scattered cities around the world.

References

insignis
Flora of Ecuador
Flora of Peru
Plants described in 1988